The Hinchinbrook Brook (French: Rivière Hinchinbrooke) is a tributary of the Châteauguay River, flowing on the south bank of the Saint Lawrence River, in:
 the municipality of Hinchinbrooke, in the administrative region of Montérégie, in the province of Quebec, in Canada;
 Franklin County, in New York State, in United States.

The lower part of the course of this river is accessible by Brook Road (east-west) and the Herdman Customs climb (north-south). The American part of the course of the river is mainly accessible by the River Street which leads south to the town of Chateaugay.

The surface of the Hinchinbrook Brook (except the rapids areas) is generally frozen from mid-December to the end of March; however, safe circulation on the ice is generally done from the end of December to the beginning of March. The water level of the river varies with the seasons and the precipitation; the spring flood occurs in March or April.

Geography 
The Hinchinbrook Brook originates in mountain and forest areas in New York State.

Upper part, in American territory (segment of )
Note: This river is designated Hinchinbrook Brook in the States of New York.

  westwards, branching north-west, to a stream (coming from south-east);
  first towards the north, then by bifurcating towards the west approaching the border, up to the Canada-US border.

Lower part, in Canadian territory (segment of )

  to the north in the forest zone, passing on the west side of Parc-Davignon, collecting the Brinkworth stream (coming from the east), along the Montée Herdman road (on the east side ) route 202, until cutting this last road on the south side of the hamlet Herdman;
  north-west then west in forest areas, sometimes agricultural, forming some streamers, up to Collins stream (coming from the south-east);
  to the west branching to the northwest, and crossing Moonlight Lake (length: ; altitude:  , to its mouth;
  towards the north-west in the agricultural zone by forming some serpentines, by cutting the rise of Powerscourt, until its mouth.

From its mouth, the current follows on  generally northwards the course of the Châteauguay river, which flows on the south bank of the St. Lawrence River.

Toponymy 
The toponym "Rivière Hinchinbrooke" was formalized on November 29, 1991 at the Commission de toponymie du Québec.

Notes and references

See also 
 

 List of rivers of Quebec

Rivers of Montérégie
Rivers of Clinton County, New York
Tributaries of the Saint Lawrence River
Le Haut-Saint-Laurent Regional County Municipality